The 2nd Tangier Regiment was raised by Charles FitzCharles, 1st Earl of Plymouth in 1680.

Part of the Standing army of King Charles II, the regiment's intended role was to help to garrison the Colony of Tangier, but that was evacuated four years later. After a number of changes of name, it became the 4th (The King's Own) Regiment of Foot when regimental numbers were introduced in the British Army in 1751.

References 

Infantry regiments of the British Army
Military units and formations established in 1680
History of Tangier
1680 establishments in the British Empire